The Brothel is the second studio album by Norwegian musician Susanne Sundfør, released on 15 March 2010 in Norway, through EMI Music Norway and Grönland Records. The album sees a shift from the piano driven pop from previous releases towards a more ambitious and electronic sound.

The Brothel was a critical and commercial success in Norway, spending 30 weeks in the Norwegian album charts and becoming platinum certified and the best-selling album in Norway in 2010. It also won Sundfør a Norwegian Grammy award for "best composer" as well as a nomination for "best lyrics".

Track listing

Credits and personnel
Credits adapted from the liner notes of The Brothel.

Locations
 Recorded at Pooka Studio
 Vocals recorded at Tomba Emmanuelle
 Drums and strings recorded at Malabar Studios
 Mixed at Duper Studio 
 Mastered at Cutting Room Studios

Personnel

 Susanne Sundfør – vocals, arrangements, piano, Fender Rhodes synthesizers, vibraphone, glockenspiel, marimba, sansula, drum programming, string arrangements, tambourine
 Lars Horntveth – production, arrangements, lap steel guitar, electric and acoustic guitars, bass guitar, baritone guitar, synth bass, bass clarinet, vibraphone, marimba, synthesizers, marxophone, percussion, kokle, water harp, piano, drum programming, strings arrangements, recording
 Morten Qvenild – synthesizer
 Gard Nilssen – drums
 Frode Larsen – violin
 Øyvind Fossheim – violin
 Nora Taksdal – viola
 Emery Cardas – cello
 Hans Petter Bang – contrabass
 Erik Johannessen – trombone, tuba
 Heming Valebjørg – snare drum, timpani
 Martin Horntveth – additional drum programming, orchestral bass drum, cymbals
 Jørgen Træen – additional drum programming and editing, mixing
 Helge Sten – vocal recording 
 Alex Kloster-Jensen – drums and strings recording
 Björn Engelmann – mastering
 Kristin Austreid – artwork

Certifications

References

2010 albums
Susanne Sundfør albums